Solitary Man is a 2009 American film co-directed by Brian Koppelman and David Levien. The film stars Michael Douglas, Susan Sarandon, Jenna Fischer, Jesse Eisenberg, Mary-Louise Parker, and Danny DeVito. The film received generally positive reviews, though it grossed just $5.68 million against its $15 million budget.

Plot
The film opens with 54-year-old Ben Kalmen (Michael Douglas), a very successful car dealer in the New York area, at his annual medical check-up; his doctor tells him he needs a CAT scan to get a better look at his heart, due to an "irregularity" in his EKG.

About six years later, Ben's fortunes have drastically changed. He is taking oral medications but never got the prescribed heart tests, and his lost sense of "immortality" has sent him on a self-destructive binge: habitual lying, illicit sexual affairs, divorce, and bad business decisions that nearly put him in prison. Ben is broke, borrowing money from his daughter Susan (Jenna Fischer), still unwilling to accept his age, ignoring his heart problem, and has a serial sexual appetite.

Ben, who cheated often on his wife Nancy Kalmen (Susan Sarandon), accompanies Allyson (Imogen Poots), the 18-year-old daughter of his girlfriend, Jordan Karsch (Mary-Louise Parker), to her college interview at a Boston college campus where Ben is an alumnus, having been a prominent donor during his more prosperous days. On campus, Ben meets an impressionable student named Daniel (Jesse Eisenberg) who appreciates his wisdom and advice. Later that night, Ben and Allyson sleep together.

Back in New York, Ben expresses a desire to continue the relationship, which Allyson dismisses as a one time experiment with an older man, in her words, crossing "the Daddy" fantasy off her "list". Frustrated with Ben and her own mother, Allyson dismissively tells her mother about the sexual encounter. Jordan is incensed and breaks off contact with Ben. She then withdraws the support Ben needs to open a new auto dealership. While discussing his overdue rent with his building manager (Lenny Venito), Susan appears and tells him he is no longer welcome in her family's life, citing the affair with Allyson and his unreliability as a grandfather of her son.

Facing eviction, Ben asks his college friend Jimmy Marino (Danny DeVito) to give him a job at his campus diner. Allyson, now a student, discovers Ben working near her. Ben receives a call from Jordan demanding he leave town immediately, threatening to resort to physical force via Allyson's father's connections. At a college party cruising, Ben recognizes a customer from the diner, then makes a sexual advance toward Daniel's new girlfriend, Maureen (Olivia Thirlby). Shortly after the girl rebuffs him, he is severely beaten by an ex-police officer (Arthur J. Nascarella) sent by Jordan.

After discussing his view of life with Jimmy, Ben collapses and wakes up in a hospital with Susan at his bedside. Ben then leaves the hospital against medical advice. He apologizes to Daniel and discovers Nancy on the bench where they met. Nancy has learned of Ben's medical condition and appears to struggle with the fact that his illness has caused his self-destructive behavior. Ben tells Nancy that aging and the prospect of dying caused him to feel "invisible", so he decided to plunge into life with full gusto. She tells him that's no excuse, but understands and offers him a ride back to the city. The film ends with Nancy waiting in the car for his decision and a young woman walking by Ben, still sitting on the bench, in the opposite direction. Ben looks one way at Nancy, then the other way at the woman. The film ends with Ben standing and looking into the camera.

Cast
 Michael Douglas as Ben Kalmen
 Mary-Louise Parker as Jordon Karsch
 Jenna Fischer as Susan Porter
 Imogen Poots as Allyson Karsch
 Susan Sarandon as Nancy Kalmen
 Danny DeVito as Jimmy Marino
 Jesse Eisenberg as Daniel Cheston
 Ben Shenkman as Peter Hartofilias
 David Costabile as Gary Porter
 Richard Schiff as Steve Heller
 Bruce Altman as Dr. Steinberg
 Olivia Thirlby as Maureen (uncredited)
 Arthur J. Nascarella as Nascarella
 Lenny Venito as the Todd The Building Manager
 Douglas McGrath as Dean Edward Giletson
 Gillian Jacobs as Tall Girl

Reception
, the film holds a 78% approval rating on the review aggregator website Rotten Tomatoes, based on 100 reviews, with an average rating of 6.80/10. The website's critics consensus reads: "Built around a singularly unpleasant main character, Solitary Man needed a flawless central performance to succeed -- and Michael Douglas delivers." "Here is one of Michael Douglas' finest performances", wrote Roger Ebert of the Chicago Sun-Times and called it "a smart, effective film."

Box office
Solitary Man has grossed $4,360,548 at the domestic box office and a worldwide total of $5,682,073.

References

External links
 
 
 
 Solitary Man at The Numbers

2009 drama films
2009 films
Films produced by Steven Soderbergh
Films scored by Michael Penn
American drama films
2000s English-language films
2000s American films